Tortricodes is a genus of moths belonging to the family Tortricidae.

Species
Tortricodes alternella ([Denis & Schiffermuller], 1775)
Tortricodes selma Kocak, 1991

See also
List of Tortricidae genera

References

External links
tortricidae.com

Cnephasiini
Tortricidae genera